O Fim do Mundo may refer to:

 The End of the World (1992 film), a Portuguese drama film
 O Fim do Mundo (TV series), a Brazilian telenovela